The Stockland Hill transmitting station is a transmitting facility of FM Radio and UHF television located near Honiton, Devon, England. This transmitter mainly serves the East of Devon and West Dorset.

Colour television came to the site in 1971. Channel Four started up in November 1982. Stockland Hill never radiated the analogue Channel Five service.

Digital television was first introduced at this site in 1998, and Digital Switchover happened in May 2009. Stockland Hill was the second transmitter in the south west of England to have its analogue television transmissions shut off. BBC Two was switched off on 6 May 2009 and the rest of the analogue services were switched off on 20 May 2009 around after midnight.

Stockland Hill currently transmits all of the DTT multiplexes at full planned ERP. The three PSB multiplexes are at 50 kW, the other three multiplexes are at 25 kW.

Services

Analogue television

29 April 1961 – 13 September 1971
405-line VHF ITV television arrived in the southwest with the simultaneous building of this station and Caradon Hill 60 miles (100 km) to the west in Cornwall.

13 September 1971 – 1 November 1982
UHF colour television commenced.

1 November 1982 – 3 January 1985
The UK's fourth UHF television channel started up.

3 January 1985 – 15 November 1998
The VHF 405-line system was discontinued across the UK, and from that point for the next 23 years, television from Stockland Hill was the originally-intended four channels on UHF only.

Analogue and Digital television

15 November 1998 – 6 May 2009
The initial roll-out of digital television involved running the digital services interleaved (and at low ERP) with the existing analogue services.

6 May 2009 – 20 May 2009
Digital Switchover commenced at Stockland Hill, with analogue BBC2 being switched off on channel 26 and BBC Mux 1 being switched off on channel 22-. Channel 26 was reused by the new BBC A multiplex at full post-DSO power (50 kW) and using 64-QAM with 8k carriers.

Digital television

20 May 2009 – 18 April 2012
Digital switchover was completed at Stockland Hill. All analogue television was switched off and the new post-DSO multiplexes took over the analogue frequencies plus a few new ones. Full power could not immediately be achieved for the COM multiplexes due to interference issues at Rowridge and in France.

18 April 2012 - present
The current UHF channels that Stockland Hill is transmitting are:

Analogue radio (FM)

Digital radio (DAB)

References

External links
 MB21's page on 405 TV to the Southwest
 "405 Alive's list of transmitters"
 More details on 405-line ITV transmitters
 The Transmission Gallery: Photographs and Information
 Stockland Hill Transmitter at thebigtower.com

Transmitter sites in England